Albert Piette (born April 18, 1960, in Namur, Belgium) is a French anthropologist and a professor at the Department of Anthropology at Paris Nanterre University.

His research has focused on questions of observation, especially in the religious world. He describes and analyses details and ordinary forms in everyday life - what he named the minor mode of reality.

For several years, the objective of Albert Piette has been to elaborate anthropology as a specific discipline, a science of the human being, different from sociology and ethnology, with precise theoretical and methodological orientations and themes. The aim is to let in the human being, as a specific entity, inside anthropology, which he considers focused on cultural sets or social systems and also on situations, actions, and relations. In contrast, the task of existential anthropology would thus be to observe, describe and analyze the micro continuity of the human being, living the moments and situations according to various modalities of presence-absence and passivity-activity. Albert Piette does not want to regard existential anthropology as secondary; on the contrary, he considers it as crucial for anthropology, its future and its detachment from social sciences. In this project, he continues to make of the minor mode an essential element to define the anthropological difference.

With the aim of detailed observations of human beings, Albert Piette thinks that ethnography, working especially on activities and groups, is less appropriate than phenomenography, which focuses on singular individuals. As the word implies, phenomenography studies on the one hand what appears, movements, postures, gestures, and on the other hand, as an empirical counterpoint to phenomenology, it also attempts to describe states of mind and feelings in the continuity of moments.

Developing this perspective, Albert Piette calls upon the notion of volume to clarify the focus of existential anthropology on the human being, which he calls a volume of being or a human volume. This notion, associated with that of volumography and volumology, allows him to insist on the unity of the human entity, its entirety, its unicity and also its stylistic continuity.

Books
 Les Jeux de la fête, Paris, Publications de la Sorbonne, 1988.
 
 Les Religiosités séculières, Paris, PUF, 1993.
 
 La Religion de près. L'activité religieuse en train de se faire, Paris, Métailié, 1999.
 
 Le Fait religieux. Une théorie de la religion ordinaire, Paris, Economica, 2003.
 
 Petit traité d'anthropologie, Marchienne-au-Pont, Socrate Editions Promarex, 2006.
 L'Être humain, une question de détails, Marchienne-au-Pont, Socrate Editions Promarex, 2007.
 L'Acte d'exister. Une phénoménographie de la présence, Marchienne-au-Pont, Socrate Editions Promarex, 2009. 
 Anthropologie existentiale, Paris, Pétra, 2009.
 Propositions anthropologiques pour refonder la discipline, Paris, Pétra, 2010.
 Fondements à une anthropologie des hommes, Paris, Hermann, 2011.
 De l'ontologie en anthropologie, Paris, Berg International, 2012.
 L'origine de la croyance, Paris, Berg International, 2013.
 Contre le relationnisme. Lettre aux anthropologues, Lormont, Le Bord de l'eau, 2014.
 Méditation pessoanienne. Science de l'existence et destin de l'Anthropologue, Paris, Éditions Matériologiques, 2014.
 Avec Heidegger contre Heidegger. Introduction à une anthropologie de l'existence, Lausanne, Éditions L'Âge d'Homme, 2014.
  What is Existential Anthropology ?, edited with Michael Jackson, New York - Oxford, Berghahn, 2015. 
  Existence in the Details. Theory and Methodology in Existential Anthropology, Berlin, Duncker & Humblot, 2015.  
 Aristote, Heidegger, Pessoa : l'appel de l'anthropologie, Paris, Pétra, 2016.
 L'humain impensé, Paris, Presses Universitaires de Paris Ouest (in collaboration with Jean-Michel Salanskis), 2016.
 Antropologia dell'esistenza, Venezia, Alvisopoli, 2016.
 Separate Humans. Anthropology, Ontology, Existence, Milan, Mimesis International, 2016.
  Le volume humain. Esquisse d'une science de l'homme, Lormont, Le Bord de l'eau, 2017. 
  Dictionnaire de l'humain (ed. with J.-M. Salanskis et al.), Nanterre, Presses Universitaires de Paris Nanterre, 2018.
 Anthropologie théorique ou comment regarder un être humain, London, Iste Editions, 2018 (translated in English: Theoretical Anthropology or How to Observe a Human Being, Wiley-Iste, 2019).

 Ethnographie de l'action. L'observation des détails, 2nd edition, Paris, Editions de l'EHESS, 2020.

 L'être-cycliste, anthropologie triste, Saint-Guilhem-le-Désert, Editions Guilhem, 2022.

 Anthropologie existentiale, autographie et entité humaine, Londres, Iste Editions, 2022.

 La religion de près, 2ième édition, Genève, Labor et Fides, 2022.

 Dictionnaire des anthropologies (ed. with M. Lequin), Nanterre, Presses Universitaires de Paris Nanterre, 2022.

Online articles and book chapters 
Directly downloadable on Albert Piette's homepage and on Academia.edu

A few comments 
 Benoît Haug, Gwendoline Torterat, Isabelle Jabiot (éds), Des instants et des jours. Observer et décrire l’existence, Paris, Pétra, 2017.
 Concetta Garofalo, L’anthropologia esistenziale di Albert Piette. Ripartie dall’individuo, Dialoghi Mediterranei, 21, September 2016 (online).
 Laurent Denizeau, L'infra de l'humain : Du mode mineur de la réalité à l'anthropologie existentiale dans l'oeuvre d'Albert Piette, Le Philosophoire, 44, 2, 2015, pp. 177–199.
 Catherine Rémy and Laurent Denizeau (éds), La Vie, mode mineur, Paris, Presses des Mines, 2015.
 Yann Schmitt, Refaire de l'anthropologie. Le singulier avant les relations, L'Homme, 214, 2015/2, pp. 137–146.
 Laurent Denizeau, Considering Human Existence: An Existential Reading of Michael Jackson and Albert Piette, in M. Jackson and A. Piette (eds), What is Existential Anthropology?, New York-Oxford, Berghahn Books, 2015, pp. 214–236.
 Stanislas Deprez, The Minor Mode. Albert Piette and the Reshaping of Anthropology, Sociologus, Volume 64, Issue 1, 2014, pp. 87–96.
 Fanny Colonna, Trois monothéismes, une cause commune, ThéoRèmes [Anthropologie des religions], February 2011 (online).
 James A. Beckford, A Minimalist Sociology of Religion?, in J. A. Beckford et J. Walliss (eds), Theorising Religion: Classical and Contemporary Debates, Aldershot, Ashgate Publishing, 2006, pp. 182–196.

References

Anthropologists of religion
French anthropologists
Living people
1960 births